The Siberian Institute of Business and Information Technology is a non-state university in Omsk, Russia, founded in 1996.

History 
The Siberian Institute of Business and Information Technology is one from the first non-state higher education institute of the Western Siberia. The institute has got the license to conduct educational activities in 1996. In 2001 it passed the first state certification and accreditation and began to issue state-recognized diplomas.

Since the beginning the institute was developing the international collaboration, especially with London Business School and Beijing University of International Business and Economics.

For today the institute develops e-learning and distance learning technologies actively and is in the top 100 Russian universities according to average salary level of its alumni2.

Training directions 
There are bachelor's and master's programs in the institute. At bachelor's degree program there are such training directions as:

 Civil law 
 Criminal law
 Accounting, analysis and audit
 Finance and credit
 Economy of organization 
 Management of the oil and gas industry
 Business administration  
 Management of organization 
 Marketing
 Financial management 
 Organization personnel management
 State and municipal management
 Applied information science in economics

At master's degree program there are such training directions as:

 Economy of the firm
 Business administration  
 State and municipal management

References

Omsk
Education in Omsk Oblast